Welda Township is a township in Anderson County, Kansas, United States. As of the 2010 census, its population was 290.

Geography
According to the USGS, it contains two cemeteries: Wardell and Welda.

References
 USGS Geographic Names Information System (GNIS)

External links

 City-Data.com
 USD 365, local school district

Townships in Anderson County, Kansas
Townships in Kansas